Pselaphomyia is a genus of flies in the family Stratiomyidae.

Species
Pselaphomyia manselli Mason, 1997
Pselaphomyia nigripennis (Bigot, 1887)

References

Stratiomyidae
Brachycera genera
Taxa named by Kálmán Kertész
Diptera of Africa